Juan Pablo Socino (born 30 May 1988) is an international Argentine rugby union player who plays as a centre, currently unattached he most recently played for Premiership Rugby side Leicester Tigers.

He has previously played for Rotherham Titans, Nottingham and Saracens in the RFU Championship, for Newcastle Falcons in Premiership Rugby, for US Dax in France's Pro D2 and for CR El Salvador in Spain's División de Honor de Rugby and for Edinburgh in the Pro14.

References

External links
Newcastle Falcons Profile

1988 births
Living people
Argentine rugby union players
Argentina international rugby union players
Rugby union fly-halves
Rugby union centres
Leicester Tigers players
Newcastle Falcons players
Nottingham R.F.C. players
Rotherham Titans players
Saracens F.C. players
US Dax players
Edinburgh Rugby players
Rugby union players from Buenos Aires